The Chongqing dog (Chinese:重庆犬 ) is an ancient mastiff Tugou historically used for hunting and guarding in Chongqing, China. Today this breed is prized as a fearless and tough protector of their family and home.

The term "Chongqing Dog" may also be used to refer to the Chuandong hound.  Both dogs share a common foundation stock and are part of the Tugou.

Description 
Chongqing Dogs are medium sized with compact muscular bodies. Their tail should be short and held upright, often described as a "bamboo stick". Their hair coat is short, course and reddish-brown or black in color. They have a blue-black tongue, prominent stop and square head. Their ears are naturally pricked, and not cropped.  

Chongqing Dogs have strong characters with outgoing temperament, confident attitude, strong prey drive, and a love for adventure and fun. They generally love children, and will also serve as an alert and faithful family guard dog. Chongqing Dogs have high prey drive and excellent scenting abilities. Chongqing Dogs can hunt alone, or in a pack, for prey ranging in size from rabbits through badgers, foxes, boar, goats, deer, and small bear. They tend to have a long lifespan of up to 15 years.

History 
Like other tugou, Chongqing are a Chinese native believed to have first appeared during the Han Dynasty. Ceramic Chongqing dog statues have been found guarding graveyards in Jiangbei area of Chongqing, dated approximately 206 BCE- 220 AD. Originally developed as a hunting dog in the mountainous areas of eastern Sichuan, rapid urbanization of Chongqing resulted in a significant population decline.  However, since the 1970s, serious efforts have been underway to restore the breed and they have become a popular utility and companion dog since.

See also
 Dogs portal
 List of dog breeds

References 

Dog breeds originating in China